The ISO 3533 standard defines the safety requirements for sex toys.

History 
The standard stems from efforts from the Swedish standards agency SIS to introduce a quality norm for sex toys after studies showed an increase of cases in Swedish emergency rooms of rectal foreign bodies, caused by badly designed sex toys. The Swedish proposal was consequentially adopted by ANSI, who then released a RfC for stakeholders in the sex toy industry. The discussion resulted in 2021 in a first release of the norm, as ISO 3533:2021.

Requirements (non-exhaustive list) 
Among the requirements this norm imposes on  manufacturers:
 Equipment like  buttplugs or anal beads that may enter the anus and rectum have to be designed in such a way that they won't get stuck, and that easy extraction by medical personnel should be feasible.
 toys such as chastity belts, cock rings and bondage cuffs must be easily removable in the case of emergency or loss of keys with common household tools such as pliers.
 toys that may enter bodily orifices should be free of burrs or sharp edges that might cause cuts.

Related 
 List of International Organization for Standardization standards

References

External links 

ISO standards
Sex toys
Product safety